The Chamber of Deputies (Cámara de Diputados) is the lower house of Paraguay's bicameral legislature, the National Congress. It is made up of 80 members, elected for a five-year term by proportional representation. The other chamber of the National Congress (Congreso Nacional) is the Chamber of Senators (Cámara de Senadores).

Unicameral congress was established in 1813, and replaced with bicameral congress including Chamber of Deputies and the Senate in 1870. In 1940, unicameral Chamber of Representatives was formed, and since 1967 there has been a bicameral legislature.

Latest election

See also
List of presidents of the Chamber of Deputies of Paraguay

References

Website
Deputies of Paraguay Website 

Government of Paraguay
Paraguay
1813 establishments in Paraguay